Jonathan Wayne Perry, known as JP Perry (born January 27, 1973), is the District 4F judge on the Louisiana Court of Appeal for the Third Circuit. Perry ran unopposed for the judgeship in the November 6, 2018 primary election, held in conjunction with general elections for Congress in the forty-nine other states. Perry assumed the post on January 1, 2019.

References

|-

|-

1973 births
Living people
American police officers
Cajun people
Louisiana city council members
Louisiana lawyers
Louisiana state court judges
Circuit court judges in the United States
Republican Party Louisiana state senators
Republican Party members of the Louisiana House of Representatives
People from Kaplan, Louisiana
University of Louisiana at Monroe alumni
Southern University Law Center alumni
21st-century American politicians
21st-century American comedians